Wellington Nascimento Carvalho (born 21 November 1992), known as Wellington, is a Brazilian football player who plays for Al-Arabi.

Club career
He made his professional debut in the Segunda Liga for Penafiel on 6 August 2016 in a game against Sporting Covilhã.

On 19 June 2022, Wellington joined Saudi Arabian club Al-Arabi.

Career statistics

References

1992 births
Footballers from São Paulo (state)
Living people
Brazilian footballers
Brazilian expatriate footballers
Figueirense FC players
São José Esporte Clube players
Boavista F.C. players
SC Mirandela players
GD Bragança players
F.C. Penafiel players
Portimonense S.C. players
G.D. Chaves players
Al-Arabi SC (Saudi Arabia) players
Liga Portugal 2 players
Primeira Liga players
Saudi First Division League players
Association football forwards
Brazilian expatriate sportspeople in Portugal
Expatriate footballers in Portugal
Brazilian expatriate sportspeople in Saudi Arabia
Expatriate footballers in Saudi Arabia